The X-Originating-IP (not to be confused with X-Forwarded-For) email header field is a de facto standard for identifying the originating IP address of a client connecting to a mail service's HTTP frontend.  When clients connect directly to a mail server, its address is already known to the server, but web frontends act as a proxy which internally connect to the mail server.  This header can therefore serve to identify the original sender address despite the frontend.

Format 

The general format of the field is:

X-Originating-IP: [198.51.100.1]

Origins 
In 1999 Hotmail included an X-Originating-IP email header field that shows the IP address of the sender. As of December 2012, Hotmail removed this header field, replacing it with X-EIP (meaning encoded IP) with the stated goal of protecting users' privacy.

See also 
 Internet privacy
 List of proxy software
 X-Forwarded-For

References 

Anonymity
Email
IP addresses